The Corn Island skink (Marisora magnacornae) is a species of skink found on Great Corn Island in Nicaragua.

References

Marisora
Reptiles described in 2012
Reptiles of Nicaragua
Endemic fauna of Nicaragua
Taxa named by Stephen Blair Hedges
Taxa named by Caitlin E. Conn